Coup d'œil (or coup d'oeil) is a term taken from French, that more or less corresponds to the words glimpse   or glance in English. The literal meaning is "stroke of [the] eye".

It is mostly used (in English) in the military, where the coup d'œil refers to the ability to discern at one glance the tactical advantages and disadvantages of the terrain. For example, King Frederick the Great of Prussia in his "Military Instruction from the Late King of Prussia to His Generals" devotes special attention to the military coup d'œil, defining it as:
[T]he perfection of that art to learn at one just and determined view the benefits and disadvantages of a country where posts are to be placed and how to act upon the annoyance of the enemy. This is, in a word, the true meaning of a coup d'œil, without which an officer may commit errors of the greatest consequence. 

The phrase increased in usage following its use by Clausewitz in the tome On War:When all is said and done, it really is the commander's coup d'œil, his ability to see things simply, to identify the whole business of war completely with himself, that is the essence of good generalship.  Only if the mind works in this comprehensive fashion can it achieve the freedom it needs to dominate events and not be dominated by them. 

Napoleon remarked upon it:There is a gift of being able to see at a glance the possibilities offered by the terrain...One can call it the coup d'œil militaire and it is inborn in great generals.

As did Folard and Liddell Hart:
The coup d'œil is a gift of God and cannot be acquired; but if professional knowledge does not perfect it, one can only see things imperfectly and in a fog, which is not enough in these matters where it is important to have a clear eye...To look over a battlefield, to take in at the first instance the advantages and disadvantages is the great quality of a general.
A vital faculty of generalship is the power of grasping instantly the picture of the ground and the situation, of relating one to the other, and the local to the general.

The coup d'œil remains important for officers in modern armies for the positioning of infantry, tanks, artillery, and other resources. It is also important for snipers, or infantry operating weapons like anti-tank weapons, in order to find good concealment, cover and a good field of fire.

In current French, the phrase simply means "glimpse." For example, it is often used in marketing materials in the same way that "At a glance..." is used in English to title a product summary.

See also
 Fingerspitzengefühl
 Rock of Eye (Tailoring)

Notes

References

Further reading
Duggan, William. Napoleon's Glance: The Secret of Strategy. Nation's Books, 2004.

External links

French words and phrases
Military terminology